Tereza Moncheva Marinova (born 5 September 1977 in Pleven) is a Bulgarian athlete who specialised in the triple jump. She was the gold medallist in that event at the 2000 Summer Olympics and a bronze medallist at the 2001 World Championships in Athletics and 1998 European Athletics Championships. She won triple jump titles at the 2001 IAAF World Indoor Championships and 2002 European Athletics Indoor Championships. She made her international debut in 1994 and retired in 2008.

At the Bulgarian Athletics Championships, she won three triple jump titles (1995, 1996, 2003) and one long jump title in 2000. She also won three triple jump titles at the Bulgarian Indoor Athletics Championships (1996, 1999, 2006), as well as the long jump title in 2000. Marinova won six Balkan championships indoors and outdoors.

Career

In her earlier days she became both European Junior and World Junior champion, and she still holds the world junior record at triple jump. At the 2000 Summer Olympics she won the gold medal with a personal best jump of 15.20 metres.

In long jump her personal best is 6.46 m. She did not compete internationally after the 2004 World Indoor Championships until 2006. She finished sixth at the 2006 European Athletics Championships.

Her father Moncho was a prominent 800 metres runner who once set a Bulgarian record and still holds the Bulgarian one mile record, and her brother Tsvetomir was a talented 400 metres runner.

Tereza Marinova retired from athletics shortly before the start of the 2008 Summer Olympics.  Nine months after that she started work as an athletics instructor. Marinova was one of the commentators for the Bulgarian National Television during the 2012 Summer Olympics. She is currently an instructor at the National Sports Academy.

Personal life

Marinova gave birth to her first child, a girl named Darina, on 17 February 2011. Her second child, a boy called Kalin, was born on 23 December 2012.

International competitions

National titles
Bulgarian Athletics Championships
Triple jump: 1995, 1996, 2003
Long jump: 2000
Bulgarian Indoor Athletics Championships
Triple jump: 1996, 1999, 2006
Long jump: 2000

Honours

Bulgarian Sportsperson of the Year - 2000

See also
Bulgaria at the 2000 Summer Olympics
List of 2000 Summer Olympics medal winners
List of Olympic medalists in athletics (women)
List of World Athletics Championships medalists (women)
List of IAAF World Indoor Championships medalists (women)
List of European Athletics Championships medalists (women)
List of European Athletics Indoor Championships medalists (women)
Triple jump at the Olympics
List of Bulgarians
List of Bulgarian sportspeople

References

External links
 
 

1977 births
Living people
Sportspeople from Pleven
Bulgarian female long jumpers
Bulgarian female triple jumpers
Olympic athletes of Bulgaria
Olympic gold medalists for Bulgaria
Olympic gold medalists in athletics (track and field)
Athletes (track and field) at the 2000 Summer Olympics
Medalists at the 2000 Summer Olympics
Goodwill Games medalists in athletics
World Athletics Championships athletes for Bulgaria
World Athletics Championships medalists
World Athletics Indoor Championships winners
European Athletics Championships medalists
Competitors at the 2001 Goodwill Games